Percival Tomlinson (born 12 October 1959) is a Jamaican cricketer. He played in one first-class match for the Jamaican cricket team in 1980/81.

See also
 List of Jamaican representative cricketers

References

External links
 

1959 births
Living people
Jamaican cricketers
Jamaica cricketers
Place of birth missing (living people)